Marcus Lorne Jewett (January 19, 1888 – October 8, 1955) was a Canadian politician. He served in the Legislative Assembly of New Brunswick as member of the Progressive Conservative party representing York County from 1931 to 1935.

References

1888 births
1955 deaths
Progressive Conservative Party of New Brunswick MLAs